= I Let You Hurt Me Soft =

Studio album by Hoopper
- Released: 2025
- Genres: Alternative R&B, alternative pop, contemporary R&B, dark pop, dark R&B
- Label: Independent
- Producer: Hoopper

Hoopper chronology
Undergoing a RE_Construction (2024)	I Let You Hurt Me Soft (2025)

I Let You Hurt Me Soft is a studio album by Hoopper, released in 2025. It has been described by music publications as drawing on alternative R&B, contemporary R&B, alternative pop, and dark pop.

The album was Hoopper's first full-length conceptual project following earlier independent releases. Coverage of the record has noted its restrained production and its focus on emotionally reflective songwriting.

== Background and composition ==
According to interviews and editorial coverage, I Let You Hurt Me Soft was developed as a narrative-driven project centered on emotional attachment and instability within a romantic relationship. Writers have described the album's sound as minimal and atmospheric, with slow tempos and sparse arrangements.

Some publications also linked the album to a broader independent alternative R&B scene, noting Hoopper's blend of R&B and pop influences.

== Track listing ==
#	Title
1	July?
2	Maybe I Don't Miss You
3	Something Real
4	Drift Into You
5	Bite My Lip
6	Can't Stop Myself
7	Clairvoyant
8	POV Remembering Us But...
9	Her Show
10	Falling With Open Eyes
11	Give It to Me
12	Dreaming
13	Nobody
14	Tired of the Fight
15	You Never Really Saw Me

All songs written by Allyson Rodrigo da Silva.

== Personnel ==
- Hoopper – vocals, production
- Allyson Rodrigo da Silva – songwriting, mastering
- Renato Oliveira (Gabriel Blesser) – mixing

== Reception ==
Coverage of the album and related releases has highlighted Hoopper's introspective songwriting and restrained production style.
